There are over 100 libraries within the University of Cambridge. These include Cambridge University Library, the main university library, affiliated libraries, departmental and faculty libraries, college libraries, and various other specialist libraries associated with the university. Across all libraries, the university houses approximately 16 million books.

University Library 

Cambridge University Library, referred to within the university as "the University Library" or just "the UL", is the central research library. It holds around 8 million items (including maps and sheet music) and, in contrast with the Bodleian or the British Library, many of its books are available on open shelves. It is one of the six legal deposit libraries in the United Kingdom, and is therefore entitled to request a free copy of every book published in the UK and Ireland. Through legal deposit, purchases and donations it receives around 100,000 books every year.

Affiliated faculty/departmental libraries 

There are thirty three faculty and departmental libraries associated with the main University Library, for the purpose of central governance and administration. This group is a growing network, with a remit to "maximise efficiency while catering to the diverse range of user needs."

Departmental and faculty libraries

College libraries 

There is at least one library in every college within the university. All colleges have a working library, generally to support undergraduate teaching. Material in the college libraries will typically cover all Tripos subjects. Many of the colleges also have special collections such as early printed books and manuscripts, and are often kept in a separate library. For example, Trinity College's Wren Library holds more than 200,000 books printed before 1800, while the Parker Library at Corpus Christi College, has one of the greatest early medieval European manuscript collections in the world, with over 600 manuscripts.

Other libraries associated with the university

See also
 Books in the United Kingdom

References

External links 
 Cambridge Libraries - All Libraries

 
Cambridge University
Cambridge